Snehlata Shrivastava is a former Indian Administrative Service officer and civil servant who served as the Secretary General of the Lok Sabha from 10 December 2017 to 30 November 2020, she served as the first woman Secretary General of the Lok Sabha. She belonged to 1982 batch of the Madhya Pradesh cadre.

Career
She has held several important positions in the Madhya Pradesh government as well as at the Centre. She has served as Secretary in the Ministry of Law and Justice and also as Special/Additional Secretary in the Ministry of Finance.

She has also held several senior positions in the Madhya Pradesh government, including as Principal Secretary in the ministries of Culture and Parliamentary Affairs.

References

1957 births
Living people
People from Bhopal
Indian Administrative Service officers